Mullerornis is a genus of extinct elephant birds (Aepyornithidae) of Madagascar.

Taxonomy
The genus is named after Georges Muller, a French explorer, who was killed in 1892 by hostile members of the Sakalava people.

Synonyms of Mullerornis modestus
Mullerornis betsilei Milne-Edwards & Grandidier, 1894 (Betsileo elephant bird)
 Mullerornis agilis Milne-Edwards & Grandidier, 1894 (agile/coastal elephant bird)
 Mullerornis rudis Milne-Edwards & Grandidier, 1894 (robust elephant bird)
 ?Mullerornis grandis Lamberton 1934 (holotype destroyed in a fire in 1995)

Description

Mullerornis is smaller than the more well-known Aepyornis. A bone possibly belonging to Mullerornis has been radiocarbon dated to about 1260 BP, suggesting that the animal was still extant at the end of the first millennium. Aepyornis modestus was shown by Hansford and Turvey (2018) to be a senior synonym of all nominal Mullerornis species described by Milne-Edwards and Grandidier (1894), resulting in the new combination Mullerornis modestus.

Palaeobiology

Nocturnality
Like other aepyornithids and its close kiwi relatives, Mullerornis was nocturnal, though it shows less optical lobe reduction than these other taxa, implying slightly more crepuscular habits.

Footnotes

References
 
 
 
 

Elephant birds
Holocene extinctions
Fossil taxa described in 1894